Lerdelimumab (CAT-152, intended trade name Trabio) is a human monoclonal antibody and an immunosuppressive drug targeting TGF beta 2. 

It was being developed to reduce scarring after glaucoma drainage surgery. Development was stopped in late 2005 after unsuccessful trial results for that condition.

References 

Monoclonal antibodies